Rabbi Shmuel Alexandrov of Bobruisk (1865–1941) was a prominent student of the Volozhin Yeshiva, who became close to the tradition of Chabad Hasidism. Alexandrov was a Jewish Orthodox mystical thinker, philosopher and anarchist, whose religious thought, an original blending of Kabbalah, Orthodox Judaism, contemporary philosophy and secular literature, are marked by universalism and some degree of antinomianism. His works include פך השמן ("the Oil Jug"), a commentary on Pirkey Avot, and a large collection of essays, מכתבי מחקר וביקורת ("Letters of Research and Investigation"). Alexandrov was influenced by the anarchistic implications of the work of Rav Kook (the first Ashkenazi chief rabbi of the British Mandate for Palestine), from which he sought to derive practical instruction. Another influence on Alexandrov was Russian philosopher Vladimir Solovyov. Alexandrov lived all his life in Bobruisk and was murdered in the Holocaust.

See also
Anarchism and Orthodox Judaism
Jewish anarchism

Further reading
“Shmuel Alksandrov”, Sefer Bobruisk (Bobruoisk book), ed. Yehuda Slutski Tel-Aviv, 1967, vol. 1, p. 322
Mikhail Agursky, “Universalist Trends in Jewish Religious Thought”, Immanuel  18 (Fall 1984), pp. 49–51
A. Greenboim, Rabanei Brit-ha-Moetsot  bein milkhamot ha-olam (Rabbis in the Soviet Union between the World Wars), Jerusalem: The Institute for Research and Documentation of East-European Jewry, 1994, p. 10.

References

1865 births
1941 deaths
20th-century Russian philosophers
Orthodox Jewish anarchists
Jewish philosophers
Lithuanian Orthodox rabbis
Individualist anarchists
Russian anarchists
Soviet anarchists
People from Babruysk
Russian Jews who died in the Holocaust
19th-century Lithuanian rabbis
Murdered anarchists